Russia participated in the Eurovision Song Contest 2004 in Istanbul, Turkey. The Russian entry was selected internally by the Russian broadcaster Channel One Russia (C1R). Yulia Savicheva represented Russia with the song "Believe Me", which placed 11th and scored 67 points at the contest.

Before Eurovision

Internal selection 
On 22 January 2004, C1R announced a submission period for interested artists and composers to submit their entries until 15 February 2004. The broadcaster received over 700 submissions at the conclusion of the deadline, including entries from Anastasia Stotskaya, Avraam Russo, Dima Bilan, Reflex and Smash. A jury panel evaluated the received submissions and selected the Russian entry. The jury consisted of Konstantin Ernst (general manager of C1R), Aleksandr Fifeman (general producer of C1R), Marina Danielyan (service manager of C1R), Yuriy Aksyuta (music director of C1R), Vladimir Matetsky (singer-songwriter and producer) and Valeriya (singer).

On 10 March 2004, C1R announced that they had internally selected Yulia Savicheva to represent Russia in Istanbul, and that a song produced by Maxim Fadeev had also been selected. The Russian song, "Believe Me", was presented to the public on 24 March 2004 through the release of the official music video. "Believe Me" was composed by Maxim Fadeev, with lyrics by Marina Boroditskaya (under the pseudonym Brenda Loring).

Participants

At Eurovision

For the Eurovision Song Contest 2004, a semi-final round was introduced in order to accommodate the influx of nations that wanted to compete in the contest. Since Russia placed 3rd in the previous contest year, Russia automatically qualified to compete in the final along with the Big Four countries and nine other nations that were also successful in the 2003 Contest. 22 semi-finalists competed for 10 spots in the final, joining Russia among the 14 pre-qualified nations. On 23 March 2004, Russia was drawn to perform 14th in the final on 15 May 2004, following Belgium and preceding a slot allotted for a semi-finalist qualifier, which was ultimately filled by Macedonia.

The Russian performance featured Savicheva performing an athletic routine with four male dancers, choreographed by Kamel Ouali. After the voting concluded, Russia scored 67 points and placed 11th. Since Russia was among the top 10 countries, excluding the nations that constitute the Big Four, Russia pre-qualified to compete directly in the final of the 2005 Contest.

Voting
C1R chose not to broadcast the semi-final of the competition on 12 May 2004 and therefore, Russia was ineligible to participate in the voting. The final was broadcast on Channel One, with commentary by Yuriy Aksyuta and Elena Batinova. The voting spokesperson for Russia was Yana Churikova.

References

2004
Countries in the Eurovision Song Contest 2004
Eurovision